The following is a list of episodes for the Australian television programme, Offspring on Network Ten.

On 3 October 2014, John Edwards confirmed that Offspring would not return for a sixth series in 2015, due to cashflow issues resulting from Ten's cost-cutting measures in its production division. However on 20 September 2015, Ten confirmed that Offspring would return for a sixth season in 2016.

Series overview

Episodes

Season 1 (2010)

Season 2 (2011)

Season 3 (2012)

Season 4 (2013)

Season 5 (2014)

Season 6 (2016)

Season 7 (2017)

Ratings

References

Lists of Australian drama television series episodes